Ocean of Fear: Worst Shark Attack Ever is a 2007 made-for-television documentary film that launched the 20th anniversary of the Discovery Channel's Shark Week of 2007. It recounts the sinking of the USS Indianapolis. The show initially aired on July 29, 2007, on the eve of the anniversary of the ship’s sinking in 1945.

The show investigated the shark attacks that occurred when the USS Indianapolis sank. Hundreds of crew that survived were stranded in the water for four days before rescue. In that time many of the survivors endured constant shark attacks. The Discovery Channel hired George H. Burgess, a renowned investigator in shark attacks, to determine, "why the sharks attacked the way they did," and to "investigate the survival strategies of the men in the water, including those who fought the sharks."

Cast and crew
The cast and crew of Ocean of Fear included these people:

 Richard Bedser, Director
 Peter Miller, Editor
 Malcolm Mclean, Director of Photography
 Charlotte Wheaton, Line Producer
 Richard Dreyfuss, Narrator. Dreyfuss starred in the film Jaws as Matt Hooper.
 Antony Edridge, Captain Charles Butler McVay III
 Simon Lee Phillips, Marine Giles McCoy
 Ryan McCluskey, Ensign Harlan Twible
 Philip Rosch, Dr Lewis Haynes
 Chris Mack, Cozell Smith
 Greg Wohead, Joseph Dronet
 Tim Beckmann, Woody James
 Philip Bulcock, Jim Newhall
 Robert Gill, Father Conway
 Ian Colquhoun, A Scottish actor who played the part of a wounded sailor.
 David Smallbone, Harry
 John Warman, Interviewer / Investigator

Historical basis
Ocean of Fear is centered on the sinking of the USS Indianapolis, which had been torpedoed by Japanese submarine I-58 on July 30, 1945 in the Philippine Sea. Of the estimated 900 men who survived the attack, only 317 were rescued after four days in shark infested waters. The Discovery Channel describes the event as "the worst shark attack in history." Surviving members of the crew attended a special screening in New York City on 18 July 2007. According to the accounts of the surviving crew, most of the men died of either exhaustion, exposure to the elements, or drinking the ocean water, not from shark attacks. However, this incident is still one of the worst cases of sharks feeding on humans.

See also
 Shark Week
 Blood in the Water
 Megalodon: The Monster Shark Lives
 Capsized: Blood in the Water

References

External links
 USS Indianapolis Survivors Organization 
 

Discovery Channel original programming